"King in a Catholic Style" is a song by China Crisis. It was released as the second single from their 1985 album Flaunt the Imperfection and reached number 19 on the UK Singles Chart.

Track listing
UK 7" single
"King in a Catholic Style" – 3.52
"Blue Sea" – 4.46

UK 12" single
"King in a Catholic Style" (Extended Version) – 7.34
"Blue Sea" – 4.46
"King in a Catholic Style" – 4.48

References

1985 songs
1985 singles
China Crisis songs
Virgin Records singles